The Andorra men's national volleyball team is the national team of Andorra.

Results

European Volleyball Championship of the Small Countries Division

Games of the Small States of Europe

External links
Andorran Volleyball Federation 

Volleyball
National men's volleyball teams
Volleyball in Andorra